The London Bank of Australia and India (1852) was a bank founded in the year 1852 in British India. The bank became defunct with the winding down of its operations in the same year in which it was founded, that is 1852. The bank was notable for being the thirty third oldest bank in India.

History

Founding  

The London Bank of Australia and India was founded in 1852 in Agra, India.

The bank largely served the customers of the United Provinces, which today corresponds to the Uttar Pradesh state of India.

Management 

The bank was staffed by mostly British nationals who were drawn mainly from the East India Company.

The bank was headquartered in the Agra city in the United Provinces.

Final years 

In 1852, the bank was on the verge of failure.

The bank was finally closed in the year 1852.

Legacy 

The bank is notable for being the thirty third oldest bank in India.

The bank played a key role in the history of Banking in India.

See also

Indian banking
List of banks in India

References

External links
 History of the bank by the Reserve Bank of India
 Australian News Snippet
 Google Books Snippet

Defunct banks of India
Companies based in Uttar Pradesh
Banks established in 1852
English-Australian culture
Indian-Australian culture and history